The Artist and the Model (French: L'artiste et son modèle, Spanish: El artista y la modelo) is a 2012 French-language Spanish drama film directed by Fernando Trueba and written by Trueba and Jean-Claude Carrière. In 2012, Fernando Trueba was nominated for the Golden Shell and won the Silver Shell for Best Director at the San Sebastián International Film Festival. The year after, the film was nominated for 13 categories in the 27th Goya Awards, including Best Film and Best Director.

Plot
In the summer of 1943 in occupied France, a famous sculptor, tired of life, finds a desire to return to work with the arrival of a young Spanish woman who has escaped from a refugee camp and becomes his muse.

Cast
Jean Rochefort as Marc Cros
Aida Folch as Mercè
Claudia Cardinale as Léa
Götz Otto as Werner
Chus Lampreave as María
Christian Sinniger as Émile
Martin Gamet as Pierre
Mateo Deluz as Henri

Accolades

See also 
 List of Spanish films of 2012

References

External links
 
 Cohen Media Group (US Distributor): http://cohenmedia.net/artist-and-the-model

2012 films
2012 drama films
Spanish drama films
2010s French-language films
Films directed by Fernando Trueba
Films about fictional painters
Films about the arts
Films with screenplays by Jean-Claude Carrière
Films about sculptors
2010s Spanish films